"Hvor små vi er" is a 2005 Danish charity single performed by a group of Danish artists (singers, actors and musicians) under the name Giv Til Asien (translated as Give to Asia). A small number of artists from other European countries also participated.

The single with lyrics by Remee and music by Nicolai Seebach and Rasmus Seebach, was released in aid of various charities for tsunami relief as a result the 2004 Indian Ocean earthquake.

Beneficiaries 
The revenues from the sale of the single went to:
 Médecins Sans Frontières
 The Danish Red Cross
 DanChurchAid (Danish Folkekirkens Nødhjælp)
 UNICEF
 Save the Children (Danish Red Barnet)
 International Federation of the Phonographic Industry (IFPI).

Track list 
 Digital download
 "Hvor små vi er" – 3:55
 CD single
 "Hvor små vi er" (Radio Edit)
 "Hvor små vi er" (Instrumental)
 "Hvor små vi er" (A Capella)

Credits 
 Lyrics and melody: Remee
 Music by Nicolai Seebach & Rasmus Seebach
 Executive producer: Remee
 Producer: Remee, Peter Biker, Nicolai Seebach and Rasmus Seebach
 Vocal producer: Peter Biker and Remee
 Guitar: Daniel Davidsen
 Other instruments: Nicolai Seebach and Rasmus Seebach
 Technicians: Hans Nielsen og Kristian Dalsgaard
 Studio: Focus Recording Studios, Vanløse
 Mixing:Mads Nilsson, White Room
 Mastering: Jan Eliasson, Tocano

Artists 
 Alberte Winding
 
 Alex
 
 Anne Linnet
 Ataf (Ataf Khawaja)
 Burhan G
 Cæcilie Norby
 
 Casper Christensen
 
 
 Hush
 Jokeren
 Julie Maria
 
 Kenneth Thordal
 Lene Nystrøm Rasted
 Liv Lykke
 Mads Mikkelsen
 Maria & Michael
 Morten Woods
 Nadia Gudmundsson
 Niels Brinck
 Nik & Jay
 Nikolai Seebach
 Nikolaj Christensen
 Nikolaj Lie Kaas
 Outlandish
 Paprika Steen
 Pernille Højmark
 Poul Krebs
 Rasmus Nøhr
 Rasmus Seebach
 Remee
 Søren Nystrøm Rasted
 Søs Fenger
 Saseline Sørensen
 Sonja Richter
 
 
 Stine Jacobsen
 Szhirley
 Tue West
 
 Virgo
 Alan Driscoll

Chart performance 

The single was released in January 2005 and went straight into No. 1 on chart of 28 January 2005 staying on the top for 14 weeks in two runs (12 weeks and 2 weeks). It stayed in total 26 weeks in the charts.

It was rereleased in December 2007 and again went in straight to No. 1 for ine week.

References 

2005 singles
2007 singles
Charity singles
Danish-language songs
Songs written by Remee
2005 songs
Songs written by Rasmus Seebach